Chapelco, or Cerro Chapelco, is a mountain and massif in Neuquén Province, south-western Argentina.

Designed by Federico Graeff and established in 1946, Chapelco became an increasingly popular tourist destination after 1970. The station maintains a ski and snowboard school with 200 instructors for all ages as well as numerous lodges, the most important of which is the Graeff Lodge; eight restaurants; a ski and snowboard rental and repair center; boutiques and cybercafés; and emergency and other basic services. The station is accessible via National Route 234 from San Martín de los Andes, and via a two-hour flight from Jorge Newbery Airport in Buenos Aires to the Aviador Carlos Campos Airport.

Chapelco hosted Snowboardcross events for the 2008-09 and 2009-10 FIS Snowboard World Cup:

See also 

 Cerro Catedral
 Cerro Castor
 Las Leñas
 List of ski areas and resorts in South America

External links 
South American Ski Resort Vacation Comparison Tool
Chapelco Ski Vacation Packages and Tours

References

Ski areas and resorts in Argentina
Mountains of Argentina
Landforms of Neuquén Province